Temporary fencing is a free standing, self-supporting fence panel. The panels are held together with couplers that interlock panels together making it portable and flexible for a wide range of applications. A common type of temporary fencing is Heras fencing.

Fence panels are supported with counter-weighted feet, have a wide variety of accessories including gates, handrails, feet and bracing depending on the application. Fence panels are commonly constructed of either chain link or weld mesh.

Temporary fencing is an alternative to its permanent counterpart when a fence is required on an interim basis when needed for storage, public safety or security, crowd control, or theft deterrence. It is also known as construction hoarding when used at construction sites. Other uses for temporary fencing include venue division at large events and public restriction on industrial construction sites, when guardrails are often used. Temporary fencing is also often seen at special outdoor events, parking lots, and emergency/disaster relief sites. It offers the benefits of affordability and flexibility.

Common forms of temporary fencing include a variety of plastic fencing or panels constructed of chainlink, steel or wire. Fencing commonly consists of individual panels that can be set up around the perimeter of the desired area to be fenced in.

Plastic temporary fencing has been used during English cricket games since 2001 as a form of crowd control.

See also

Crowd control barriers
Vinyl fence

References 

Fences
Construction safety
Perimeter security